The 1959 Cork Intermediate Hurling Championship was the 50th staging of the Cork Intermediate Hurling Championship since its establishment by the Cork County Board in 1909. The draw for the opening round fixtures took place at the Cork Convention on 25 January 1959. The championship ran from 12 April to 13 September 1959.

On 13 September 1959, Mallow won the championship following a 2-08 to 3-03 defeat of St. Vincent's in the final. This was their second championship title overall and a first title in 36 years.

Results

Quarter-finals

Semi-finals

Final

References

Cork Intermediate Hurling Championship
Cork Intermediate Hurling Championship